Gilbreath is a surname. Notable people with the surname include:

Alexandra Gilbreath (born 1969), English actress
Erasmus Corwin Gilbreath (1840–1898), United States Army officer
Frederick Gilbreath (1888-1980), United States Army officer
Lucas Gilbreath (born 1996), American baseball player
Norman L. Gilbreath (born 1936), American magician and mathematician 
Rod Gilbreath, American baseball player
Wardell Gilbreath (born 1954), American sprinter
William C. Gilbreath (1851–1921), American politician

See also
Gilbreath's conjecture, a conjecture in number theory
Gilbreath shuffle, a card shuffling method
Gilbreth